Vladimir Mikhailovich Zemlyanikin (27 October 1933 – 27 October 2016) was a film and theater actor. He was an Honored Artist of the Russian Federation (1994).

Biography 
Vladimir Zemlyanikin born in Moscow on 27 October 1933.

With the onset of World War II, he and his mother were evacuated. After the war, Vladimir became involved in the initiative in the City Palace of Pioneers, and then in the Palace of Culture ZiL.

In 1951, Vladimir filed documents in the Moscow Art Theater School, School Shchepkin, Boris Shchukin Theatre Institute. They took it to the Shchukin Institute.

In 1954, Zemlyanikin debuted in the movie,    Tatyana Lukashevich's film Certificate of Maturity. In 1956, he graduated from institute.

Before 1959, he was a Studio Theatre actor and film actor in Moscow. He later worked at the Sovremennik Theatre.

He died on 27 October 2016, his 83rd birthday.

Personal life 
 First wife —  Lyubov Lifentsova (Strizhenova). In this marriage a daughter, Elena. 
 Who is married to journalist Lyudmila Yegorova (Zemlyanikina).

Filmography 
 1954 —  Problem Child
 1954 —  Certificate of Maturity
 1956 —  Different Fates
 1957 —  The House I Live In
 1957 —  The Story of First Love
 1959 —  Chernomorochka
 1959 —  The Unamenables
 1960 —  Noisy Day
 1963 —  Silence
 1965 —  A Traveler with Luggage
 1966 —  Build Bridges
 1972 —  Big School-Break
 1973 —  Eternal Call
 1979 —  Particularly Important Task
 1982 —  Department
 1985 —  Battle of Moscow
 1985 — Road  Anna Firling
1990 —  Fools Die on Friday
1992 —   Murder on Zdanovskaya 
 2003 —  Marsh Turetskogo
 2007 —  Lenin's Testament
2008 —  Alias Albanian 2 
 2008 —  Whirlwind 
 2010 —  Three Women of Dostoyevsky 
  2011 —  Red Fountains

References

External links

 Владимир Земляникин at the KinoPoisk

1933 births
2016 deaths
Russian male actors
Soviet male actors
Honored Artists of the Russian Federation
Male actors from Moscow
20th-century Russian male actors
21st-century Russian male actors